Full Term in the universities of Oxford and Cambridge refers to the eight weeks within the longer academic term, during which lectures are given and students are required to be in residence. The dates of Full Term may differ from year to year within the fixed dates of the whole term (simply, but ambiguously, referred to as "Term" with a capital, or occasionally "statutory term").

References
 University of Oxford: Regulations on the number and length of terms
 University of Oxford term dates
 University of Cambridge term dates

Oxbridge
Terminology of the University of Cambridge
Terminology of the University of Oxford
Specific calendars